Game on Board is a 1936 German comedy crime film directed by Herbert Selpin and starring Viktor de Kowa, Susi Lanner and Alfred Abel.

The film's sets were designed by the art director Erich Czerwonski. Location shooting took place in Bremerhaven and New York and on the Atlantic crossing of the ocean liner SS Bremen. Interior scenes were shot at the Tempelhof Studios in Berlin.

Cast
 Viktor de Kowa as Viktor Müller
 Susi Lanner as Susanne Rauh, Sekretärin
 Alfred Abel as I. C. Corner, Konzernchef
 Carsta Löck as Fräulein Distelmann, Politesse
 Jakob Tiedtke as Herr Henning
 Erika Bert as Astrid, seine Tochter
 Hubert von Meyerinck as Marquis de la Tours, ein Betrüger
 Paul Heidemann as Baron von Western, sein Komplize
 Ernst Waldow as Corner Sekretär Black
 Günther Lüders as Matrose
 Erich Fiedler as Obersteward
 Hans Joachim Schaufuß as Boy Horst
 Edith Meinhard as erste Bewerberin für den Sekretärinposten
 Max Wilmsen as Hafenarbeiter
 Fritz Draeger as Steward
 Lothar Devaal as Steward
 Curt Lauermann as Besatzungsmitglied
 Jutta von Remsky as zweite Bewerberin für den Sekretärinposten
 Curt de Planque as Tänzer im Speisesaal
 Ferdinand Robert as Passagier im Speisesaal
 Klaus Seiwert as Passagier im Speisesaal
 Ernst Stimmel
 Flora Berthold

References

Bibliography

External links

1936 films
1930s crime comedy films
German crime comedy films
Films of Nazi Germany
1930s German-language films
Films directed by Herbert Selpin
Films set on ships
Terra Film films
Films shot at Tempelhof Studios
German black-and-white films
1936 comedy films
1930s German films